Myuna Bay is a suburb of the City of Lake Macquarie in New South Wales, Australia, and is located west of Lake Macquarie near Wangi Wangi.

Myuna Bay is largely undeveloped. It has a rest area on Wangi Road, dating back to when Wangi Road was the main road along the western shoreline of Lake Macquarie before the completion of the Sydney-Newcastle Freeway.

Myuna Bay is home to the New South Wales Government Myuna Bay Sport and Recreation Centre.

References

External links
 History of Myuna Bay (Lake Macquarie City Library)

Suburbs of Lake Macquarie
Bays of New South Wales